

Election results
The following is a list of elections in Mayor of New Orleans and a summary of their results.

Elections since 1930
Since 1930, New Orleans has used a two-round system with a preliminary round and a runoff if no candidate reached a majority in the first round.

Elections from 1866—1925
The following is a list of elections held between the end of the Civil War and 1925 

No election; Benjamin F. Flanders appointed by Governor Henry Clay Warmoth

Elections before Civil War

Notes
A. Only listing candidates who received a vote share of at least 5%

References